Ernest Franklin Zeigler II (born January 31, 1966) is an American college basketball coach, currently an assistant at the University of Nebraska. He spent the previous eight seasons as an assistant coach at Mississippi State, and prior to that was the men's head coach at Central Michigan University. He received a Bachelor's in Business Management from Cleary College in 1994.  He played collegiately at Schoolcraft College (1984–86), Armstrong Atlantic State University (1986–87) and Northwood University (1987–88).

Zeigler has also coached in China, Saudi Arabia, at Kansas State, Bowling Green and at Detroit Cody High School before serving on Ben Howland's staff at Pittsburgh and at UCLA. Zeigler left UCLA to take on the head coaching job at Central Michigan where his son, Trey Zeigler, played for him. Trey transferred to Pittsburgh after his father was fired.

Head coaching record

References

1966 births
Living people
American expatriate basketball people in China
American expatriate basketball people in Saudi Arabia
American men's basketball coaches
American men's basketball players
Armstrong State Pirates men's basketball players
Basketball coaches from Michigan
Basketball players from Detroit
Bowling Green Falcons men's basketball coaches
Central Michigan Chippewas men's basketball coaches
Cleary University alumni
College men's basketball head coaches in the United States
Detroit Mercy Titans men's basketball coaches
High school basketball coaches in the United States
Junior college men's basketball players in the United States
Kansas State Wildcats men's basketball coaches
Mississippi State Bulldogs men's basketball coaches
Northwood Timberwolves men's basketball players
Pittsburgh Panthers men's basketball coaches
Schoolcraft College alumni
UCLA Bruins men's basketball coaches